West Point is an unincorporated community in Isanti County, Minnesota, United States.

The community is located at the junction of State Highway 47 (MN 47) and Roanoke Street NW.  The Rum River flows through the community.

West Point is located at the survey point boundary line for:
Wyanett Township
Springvale Township
Bradford Township
Spencer Brook Township

References

 Official State of Minnesota Highway Map – 2013/2014 edition
 Mn/DOT map of Isanti County – 2013 edition

Unincorporated communities in Minnesota
Unincorporated communities in Isanti County, Minnesota